The North Western Bank of India (1840) was a bank founded in the year 1840 in Mussoorie, British India. The bank was the nineteenth oldest bank in India.

History

Founding  

The bank was founded in 1840 in Mussoorie by English businessmen. The headquarters of the bank were later shifted to Meerut.

The bank was initially named as the Mussoorie Bank. After its headquarter was moved to Meerut, the bank was renamed as The North Western Bank of India.

The seven earliest directors of the bank were: T. F. Blois, William M. George, H. S. Ravenshaw, William Freeth, J. Angelo, W. H. Orde and R. Willis.

Management 

The bank's area of operations was largely centered around the United Provinces of British India, which corresponds to the present day states of Uttar Pradesh and Uttarakhand. Both Mussoorie and Meerut were located in this same province or region. Most of the earliest employees of the bank were sourced from the Chartered Bank of India, Australia and China.

Some of the branches of the North Western Bank also operated from the branches of the Chartered Bank of India, Australia and China

Final Years 

In its later years, the bank was headquartered in Calcutta and had opened branches in London, Mussoorie, Bombay and Singapore.

The bank was finally liquidated in 1859, as it was unable to withstand the competition from more well capitalized banks.

Legacy 

The bank is notable for being the nineteenth oldest bank in India.

See also

Indian banking
List of banks in India
List of oldest banks in India

References

External links
 Oldest Banks in India
 Banking in India

Defunct banks of India
Banks established in 1840